The Jharsuguda Engineering School(JES), Jharsuguda is a state government run diploma engineering school established in 1955 by Government of Odisha. Currently the institution is affiliated to SCTE & VT & DTET of Orissa. It gives three year diploma courses in variety of branches of engineering. It also obeys the norms of AICTE.

History 
The institute was second most old institute for diploma education established in Odisha. It was established in 1955 by Directorate of Technical Education & Vocational Training, Orissa with the help from Department of Industries of Orissa. In the recent history 2006 the institute had observed its Golden Jubilee with the presence of the honourable Chief Minister of Orissa. It has also been helped by the leading industries near by it both private & public sector companies.

Campus 
The campus of the institution is located having both road & rail communication having a land of 78.02 acres area. It is located 2 km from the nearest town Jharsuguda bus stand & 4 km from the Jharsuguda Railway Station & N.H. No.49. The institute also have good infra-structured campus as it is one of a leading diploma institutes in Odisha. As in Jharsuguda district there are several industries established. The institution is basically surrounded by industries.

Courses offered 
 Civil Engineering
 Electrical Engineering
 Mechanical Engineering
 E & TC Engineering
 Information Technology

Admission procedure 
The students are admitted through DET(Diploma Entrance Test) conducted by SCTE&VT, Odisha. There is also provision of Lateral Entry of 10% of sanctioned intake for lateral entry rank holders(ITI & +2 Sc. holders) for admission directly to the third Semester in their respective branch of study as per the SCTE&VT guidelines.

References

External links

Engineering colleges in Odisha
Jharsuguda district
1955 establishments in Orissa
Educational institutions established in 1955